Hyposmocoma opuulaau is a species of moth of the family Cosmopterigidae. It is endemic to Maui.

The wingspan is 6.9–8.5 mm for males and 8.6–8.9 mm for females.

The larvae live in a larval case which has the form of an elongate cone-shaped structure which is decorated with beige, brown, and black bits of sand and dried vegetation woven with silk filaments on the dorsal half of the case. It is bicolored, pale gray to silver and smooth ventrally.

Etymology
The specific name is derived from the Hawaiian, ‘ōpu‘u (meaning cone) and lā‘au (meaning tree) and refers to the type of case and habitat of this species.

References

Opuulaau
Endemic moths of Hawaii
Moths described in 2011